Chris Wilcox (born October 30, 1997) is an American football cornerback for the Pittsburgh Steelers of the National Football League (NFL). He played college football at BYU and was drafted by the Tampa Bay Buccaneers in the seventh round, 251st overall, in the 2021 NFL Draft.

Professional career

Tampa Bay Buccaneers
Wilcox was drafted by the Tampa Bay Buccaneers in the seventh round (251st overall) of the 2021 NFL Draft. He signed his four-year rookie contract on May 13, 2021. He was waived on August 31, 2021.

Indianapolis Colts
On September 1, 2021, Wilcox was claimed off waivers by the Colts. He was waived on September 14, 2021, and re-signed to the practice squad. He signed a reserve/future contract on January 10, 2022.

On August 30, 2022, Wilcox was waived by the Colts and signed to the practice squad the next day. He was released on September 13.

Arizona Cardinals
On December 28, 2022, Wilcox signed with the practice squad of the Arizona Cardinals.

Pittsburgh Steelers
On January 11, 2023, Wilcox signed a reserve/future contract with the Pittsburgh Steelers.

References

External links
BYU Cougars bio

1997 births
Living people
Tampa Bay Buccaneers players
Indianapolis Colts players
Arizona Cardinals players
BYU Cougars football players
People from Fontana, California
Players of American football from California
Sportspeople from San Bernardino County, California
American football cornerbacks
Pittsburgh Steelers players